The following outline is provided as an overview of and topical guide to Tristan da Cunha:

The territory consists of the main island, Tristan da Cunha (area: 98 km2, 38 sq mi), as well as several uninhabited islands: Inaccessible Island and the Nightingale Islands. Tristan da Cunha is the most remote archipelago in the world.

General reference 

 Pronunciation: 
 Common English country name: Tristan da Cunha
 Official English country name: Tristan da Cunha
 Common endonym(s):  
 Official endonym(s):  
 Adjectival(s): Tristonian
 Demonym(s): Tristonian
 Etymology: Name of Tristan da Cunha: from the Portuguese explorer Tristão da Cunha
 ISO region code:  SH-TA
 Internet country code top-level domain: none (.uk or .sh can be used)

Geography of Tristan da Cunha 

Geography of Tristan da Cunha
 Tristan da Cunha is: an island and (together with other islands) part of the British overseas territory of Saint Helena, Ascension and Tristan da Cunha
 Location:
 Southern Hemisphere and Western Hemisphere
 Atlantic Ocean
 South Atlantic
 Time zone:  Greenwich Mean Time (UTC+00)
 Extreme points of Tristan da Cunha
 High:  Queen Mary's Peak  – highest peak in South Atlantic Ocean
 Low:  South Atlantic Ocean 0 m
 Land boundaries:  none
 Coastline:  South Atlantic Ocean 40 km
 Population of Tristan da Cunha: 297 (2014 census)

 Area of Tristan da Cunha:
Total: 207 km2 (80 sq mi)
Main island: 98 km2
 Atlas of Tristan da Cunha

Environment of Tristan da Cunha 

 Climate of Tristan da Cunha
 Renewable energy in Tristan da Cunha
 Geology of Tristan da Cunha
 Protected areas of Tristan da Cunha
 Biosphere reserves in Tristan da Cunha
 National parks of Tristan da Cunha
 Wildlife of Tristan da Cunha
 Fauna of Tristan da Cunha
 Birds of Tristan da Cunha
 Mammals of Tristan da Cunha

Natural geographic features of Tristan da Cunha 

 Fjords of Tristan da Cunha
 Islands of Tristan da Cunha
 Lakes of Tristan da Cunha
 Mountains of Tristan da Cunha
 Volcanoes in Tristan da Cunha
 Rivers of Tristan da Cunha
 Waterfalls of Tristan da Cunha
 Valleys of Tristan da Cunha
 World Heritage Sites in Tristan da Cunha: None

Regions of Tristan da Cunha 

Regions of Tristan da Cunha

Ecoregions of Tristan da Cunha 

List of ecoregions in Tristan da Cunha
 Ecoregions in Tristan da Cunha

Demography of Tristan da Cunha 

Demographics of Tristan da Cunha

Government and politics of Tristan da Cunha 

Politics of Tristan da Cunha
 Form of government:
 Capital of Tristan da Cunha: Edinburgh of the Seven Seas
 Elections in Tristan da Cunha
 Political parties in Tristan da Cunha

Branches of government 

Government of Ascension Island

Executive branch 
 Head of state: British monarch
 Head of government: Governor of Saint Helena, Ascension and Tristan da Cunha
 Administrator of Tristan da Cunha

Legislative branch 
 Island Council

Judicial branch 

Court system of Saint Helena
 Saint Helena Supreme Court

Foreign relations of Tristan da Cunha 

Foreign relations of Tristan da Cunha
 Diplomatic missions in Tristan da Cunha

International organization membership 
none

Law and order in Tristan da Cunha 

Law of Tristan da Cunha
 Constitution of Tristan da Cunha
 Crime in Tristan da Cunha
 Human rights in Tristan da Cunha
 LGBT rights in Tristan da Cunha
 Freedom of religion in Tristan da Cunha
 Law enforcement in Tristan da Cunha

Military of Tristan da Cunha 
 Commander-in-Chief: Governor of Saint Helena, Ascension and Tristan da Cunha

Local government in Tristan da Cunha 

Local government in Tristan da Cunha

History of Tristan da Cunha 

History of Tristan da Cunha
 Timeline of the history of Tristan da Cunha
 Current events of Tristan da Cunha
 Military history of Tristan da Cunha

Culture of Tristan da Cunha 

Culture of Tristan da Cunha
 Architecture of Tristan da Cunha
 Cuisine of Tristan da Cunha
 Festivals in Tristan da Cunha
 Languages of Tristan da Cunha
 Media in Tristan da Cunha
 National symbols of Tristan da Cunha
 Coat of arms of Tristan da Cunha
 Flag of Tristan da Cunha
 National anthem of Tristan da Cunha
 People of Tristan da Cunha
 Public holidays in Tristan da Cunha
 Records of Tristan da Cunha
 Religion in Tristan da Cunha
 Christianity in Tristan da Cunha
 Hinduism in Tristan da Cunha
 Islam in Tristan da Cunha
 Judaism in Tristan da Cunha
 Sikhism in Tristan da Cunha
 World Heritage Sites in Tristan da Cunha: None

Art in Tristan da Cunha 
 Art in Tristan da Cunha
 Cinema of Tristan da Cunha
 Literature of Tristan da Cunha
 Music of Tristan da Cunha
 Television in Tristan da Cunha
 Theatre in Tristan da Cunha

Sports in Tristan da Cunha 

Sports in Tristan da Cunha
 Football in Tristan da Cunha
 Tristan da Cunha at the Olympics

Economy and infrastructure of Tristan da Cunha 

Economy of Tristan da Cunha
 Economic rank, by nominal GDP (2007):
 Agriculture in Tristan da Cunha
 Banking in Tristan da Cunha
 National Bank of Tristan da Cunha
 Communications in Tristan da Cunha
 Internet in Tristan da Cunha
 Companies of Tristan da Cunha
Currency of Tristan da Cunha: Pound sterling
ISO 4217: GBP
 Energy in Tristan da Cunha
 Energy policy of Tristan da Cunha
 Oil industry in Tristan da Cunha
 Health care in Tristan da Cunha
 Mining in Tristan da Cunha
 Tristan da Cunha Stock Exchange
 Tourism in Tristan da Cunha
 Transport in Tristan da Cunha
 Airports in Tristan da Cunha
 Rail transport in Tristan da Cunha
 Roads in Tristan da Cunha
 Water supply and sanitation in Tristan da Cunha

Education in Tristan da Cunha 

Education in Tristan da Cunha

See also 

Tristan da Cunha
Index of Tristan da Cunha-related articles
List of international rankings
List of Tristan da Cunha-related topics
Outline of Africa
Outline of geography
Outline of Saint Helena
Outline of the United Kingdom

References

Further reading 
 
 
 First postcode for remote UK isle – BBC News
 The Utmost Parts of the Earth, by William F. Taylor – Account of the island from 1856
 World's most remote island gets advanced medical support from team led by IBM and Beacon Equity Partners Tristan Times, 14 November 2007
 World's Most Remote Island Gets Advanced Medical Support From Team Led by IBM and Beacon Equity Partners IBM press release, Armonk, NY - 14 November 2007

External links 

 Tristan da Cunha Official Website
 TristanDaCunha.co.uk
 
 Contains bibliography

Tristan da Cunha